MJB may refer to:

Mary J. Blige (born 1971), American singer
Matthew James Bellamy, a lead guitarist and singer of rock band Muse, composer and songwriter
MJB (coffee), an American brand of coffee
Movement for Justice en el Barrio, a community organization in New York
Mejit Airport, a Marshall Islands airport with IATA code MJB
Magic Blue Airlines, a former Dutch airline with ICAO code MJB